Phylloporus veluticeps is a species of fungus in the family Boletaceae.

Fungi described in 1891
veluticeps